

Overview

The Wisconsin Department of Tourism is a governmental agency of the U.S. state of Wisconsin responsible for marketing and promoting the state as a travel destination.  As of January 2019, the Secretary of the department is Sara Meaney.

A primary tool that the department uses to fulfill its mission and duties is maintaining its official web site, TravelWisconsin.com, which contains a wide variety of information, including access to reservations at various amenities.  Although the department has had the site since 1996, a major update occurred in 2001 as part of a strategic re-prioritization of information technology.

Tourism is a huge economic driver in Wisconsin. In 2018, the industry had a $21.6 billion impact on the state with more than 112 million visitors. Additionally, tourism in 2018 generated $1.6 billion in state and local revenue and $1.2 billion in federal taxes and supported 199,073 jobs in the state of Wisconsin.

Although a department of tourism was called for by leaders as early as 1967, prior to 1995 state sponsored tourism promotion was performed as a division of other departments.  The department began operations on December 24, 1995, under its first secretary Richard "Moose" Speros.

Tourism grant programs 
The Wisconsin Department of Tourism invests heavily in ventures around the state through grant programs.

Attached boards

Four boards are attached to the Department of Tourism:

 Wisconsin Arts Board
 Kickapoo Reserve Management Board
 Lower Wisconsin State Riverway Board
 Wisconsin State Fair Park Board

Past secretaries

Secretaries (1995–present)

See also
 Wisconsin State Fair

References

External links
 
 
 

Tourism
Government agencies established in 1995
Tourism in Wisconsin
1995 establishments in Wisconsin